Russell & Bromley is a British footwear and handbag retailer founded in 1873, that operates 43 stores and 2 concessions in the UK. The company is still run and owned by the Bromley family.

History
Russell & Bromley began in 1873, when George Bromley, a shoemaker married his employer Albion Russell's daughter Elizabeth in Lewes, England. Elizabeth's grandfather, John Clifford Russell had established a shoe making business in 1820. The family store in Eastbourne became the first to carry the Russell and Bromley name above the door in 1880. 

In 1898, Frederick, George and Elizabeth's son, joined the business and he opened a store in Tonbridge. He then founded an additional store in Sevenoaks, which started an expansion programme of opening additional stores and purchasing smaller independent retailers. In 1905, Frederick moved its operations from Eastbourne to Bromley in Kent. In 1936, Frederick retired and handed the business to his sons Frederick Keith (usually known as 'Toby') and Michael, and by the start of World War II had 20 branches.

In 1947, the brothers opened their first store in London's Bond Street, which saw the change of business focus to high end retailer. In 1968, this was completed by the closure of a quarter of the branches to concentrate on the higher end of the market. The company has since progressed from selling just footwear and now includes ladies handbags and men's belts as part of its range.

In 2022, it was announced that the busisess would open its first store outside of the U.K. on Grafton Street in Dublin.

External links

References

English brands
1880 establishments in England
Retail companies of England
Companies based in the London Borough of Bromley
Shoe brands
Shoe companies of the United Kingdom
Retail companies established in 1880
British companies established in 1880